Ajay Prabhakar is an Indian researcher and author who until 2014, was a United Nations Country Programme officer.  He has worked with the Nigerian Presidency in the Arts and Culture parastatal under President Olusegun Obasanjo. Prabhakar still serves as a consultant to the United Nations and other International bodies on Sustainable Development Goals, Technology, Research and Education.

Early life
Born in Kerala, on 24 June 1978, to N. Prabhakar and Devi Prabhakar, Ajay Prabhakar is a graduate of the Mumbai University and has a doctoral degree from the University of North Carolina.

Career
Prabhakar is the author of six books, many of which are being used in schools, colleges and universities in the United States of America, Europe, Asia and Africa. He has done several projects under the aegis of United Nations in the domains of Education, Sustainable Development, Research, Archaeology, Governance etc. He was appointed Africa Renaissance Ambassador and also serves as an Ambassador for Global Peace by the Universal Peace Federation. He was decorated as an Ambassador for Research and Education by the Nigerian Presidency.

Prabhakar is the head of several research projects being carried out in Africa, Asia, Europe and the USA. He has worked extensively on multiple archaeological research projects with the Cross River State Government, specifically with the ministry of arts and culture, under then Governor Donald Duke, which included conservation, advocacy, sensitization and preservation of the Ikom Monoliths. He has received a letter of appreciation from the Governor Donald Duke for the same.

Prabhakar has also been involved for many years, in the linguistic and the archaeological study, comparison and the technical analysis of the Monolithic writings in Ireland, namely the Turoe Stone, the Castlestrange Stone, the Newgrange burial mound and the Ikom Monoliths. The findings of these studies have been published in his book The Gram Code and the subsequent papers published by him. The highlight of the whole project was the extensive use of artificial intelligence in different aspects of the project, but in particular, for the identification and mapping of the symbols.

The research team under the leadership of Prabhakar, was also instrumental in bringing to the world stage, the pillaging and near destruction of the monolith sites  by including them in the US and Europe Heritage Tour, under the aegis of the United Nations and getting them included in the World Monuments Fund watch list.

Other sites include the Homo Erectus site in Okigwe, Monolithic writings in Ireland and the lost city of Igbale Aiye, Benin, among the prominent others. His work has been referred to and appreciated in other prominent research projects.

Prabhakar has also worked with the office of several world leaders like General Olusegun Obasanjo, General Ibrahim Badamasi Babangida and William Jefferson Clinton through his association with United Nations. Together with Catherine Acholonu, he is the co-founder of the Catherine Acholonu Research Foundation (CARC).

Ajay Prabhakar currently serves as the Founder and Chairman of Pioneers Nation, an organization which deals with research in the domains of archaeology, archiving and education. He is a speaker and thought leader on the topics of leadership, technology, education and creativity and has traveled the world, presenting at various prestigious academic, government and private organizations.

Bibliography
His books include the Gram Code of African Adam, Windows XP and Productivity Program, written in conjunction with Microsoft, The Lost testaments of the African Adam, Impressions, A Different Path and They lived before Adam.
He has also been in the forefront of several community based projects in Africa, some of them notably the Education for all project, motherless babies and the child soldier rehabilitation projects.

Works 
Books authored by Ajay Prabhakar
 The Gram Code of African Adam: Stone Books and Cave Libraries, Reconstructing 450,000 Years of Africa's Lost Civilizations, 2005 
 Windows XP and Productivity Programs (Microsoft UP Project Handbook)
 The Lost Testament of the Ancestors of Adam: Unearthing Heliopolis/Igbo Ukwu – The Celestial City of the Gods of Egypt and India, 2010
 Impressions - A Handbook on Research and Processes
 They Lived Before Adam: Pre-Historic Origins of the Igbo – The Never-Been-Ruled (Ndi Igbo since 1.6 million B.C.) 
 A Different Path

White Papers by Dr. Ajay Prabhakar
 Comparison and Implementation of Educational Grass root models in Asia and Africa
 Olaudah Equiano – A Linguistic and Anthropological Search, The Journal of Commonwealth Literature. 22.1 (1987). 5–16.
 The Igbo Roots of Olaudah Equiano, 1995, revised 2007.

Honors
African Renaissance Ambassador (Ambassadeur Afrique Renaissance)
Ambassador for World Peace
Ambassador of Advancement in Research, Education and Technology

Awards
The International Book Award 2010
The Flora Nwapa Award 2009
The Phillis Wheatley Award 2007
The Harlem Book Fair Award 2008

See also
 List of Indian writers

References

Living people
1978 births
Writers from Kerala
University of Mumbai alumni